Daniel Klewer (born 4 March 1977) is a German former footballer.

Career
Klewer was born in Rostock, East Germany, and joined the youth team of his home team, Hansa Rostock, at the age of six. After going through all of their junior squads, he broke into the first-team squad for the first time in the 1997–98 season sitting on the bench as a substitute goalkeeper for several matches. His first-team debut on the pitch, however, did not come until four seasons later. Before that he had served as a first-choice keeper for Rostock's reserve team and a third-string goalkeeper for the Bundesliga squad.

In March 2002 Klewer played his first Bundesliga game after the first and second-choice keepers were out with injury and suspension respectively. Klewer stayed first-choice for the remaining eight games of the 2001–02 season, which saw Rostock stave off relegation. At the beginning of the following season Klewer stepped back behind regular first-choice keeper Matthias Schober but advanced to a second-string position. He only saw action twice more in 2003–04 season before opting to leave Rostock after twenty-one years of playing for the club.

He joined 1. FC Nürnberg in the summer of 2004 but could not unseat Raphael Schäfer as the starting goalkeeper, playing merely five games in the 2004–05 season when substituting for an injured Schäfer. next season he saw no Bundesliga action at all, playing just twice in DFB-Pokal matches. He reprised his role as replacement goalkeeper once again in the 2006–07 playing in one league game and two cup matches until the end of 2006. In the third round cup match against Unterhaching he saved four penalties in the shoot-out and secured Nürnberg a spot in the quarter finals. He did a tremendous job in the quarter final on 27 February 2007 and saved two penalties against Hanover in the shoot-out and brought his team into the semi-finals of the DFB-Pokal.

Coaching career

He work as goalkeeping coach for 1. FC Nürnberg. He started as goalkeeping coach in July 2011 for the reserve team and was there until he was promoted to the first team in July 2014 On 11 November 2014, the day after Valérien Ismaël was sacked, Klewer, along with Markus Zidek, led training for the club.

Honours

Club
1. FC Nürnberg
 DFB-Pokal: 2006–07

References

External links
 

1977 births
Living people
German footballers
FC Hansa Rostock players
1. FC Nürnberg players
Bundesliga players
Sportspeople from Rostock
Association football goalkeepers
Footballers from Mecklenburg-Western Pomerania